Timothy Andrew John Dawson (born 29 January 1963) is an English former first-class cricketer.

Dawson was born in West Germany at Münster in January 1963. He studied at the University of Oxford, where he played first-class cricket for Oxford University in 1986, making seven appearances. He scored 32 runs in his seven matches, in addition to taking 13 wickets with his off break bowling at an average of 49.92, with best figures of 3 for 65.

References

External links

1963 births
Living people
Sportspeople from Münster
Alumni of the University of Oxford
English cricketers
Oxford University cricketers
English cricketers of 1969 to 2000